The 6th IAAF World Cup in Athletics was an international track and field sporting event sponsored by the International Association of Athletics Federations, held on September 25–27, 1992, at the Estadio Panamericano in Havana, Cuba.

Overall results

Results summary

Men

Women

References
World Cup Results at GBR Athletics
Results at AthleticsDB
Full Results by IAAF

IAAF Continental Cup
World Cup
IAAF World Cup
International athletics competitions hosted by Cuba